Gianfranco Brancatelli (born 18 January 1950 in Turin, Piedmont) is a former racing driver from Italy.

Career
His racing career began in 1973, in the Formula Abarth series. In 1975, he advanced to Italian Formula 3 racing. Brancatelli entered 3 Formula One Grands Prix in 1979 with Kauhsen (2 failures to qualify) and Merzario (1 failure to pre-qualify).

After his departure from Formula 1, Brancatelli went on to race in several Touring Car series, with some success. He would finish 4th in the 1984 European Touring Car Championship driving a BMW 635 CSi for Eggenberger Motorsport. For the 1985 ETCC, Eggenberger switched to the turbocharged Volvo 240T (while the championship winning Tom Walkinshaw Racing would switch from their powerful V12 Jaguar XJS' to the V8 powered Rover Vitesse), and along with Swedish driver Thomas Lindström, Brancatelli became the European Touring Car Champion, winning six out of fourteen races (Anderstorp, Zeltweg, Salzburgring, Nürburgring, Zolder and Estoril), along with three 2nd places and two 3rd places.

In 1986, Brancatelli switched to Tom Walkinshaw Racing where he drove a Rover Vitesse in the 1986 FIA International Touring Car Championship (essentially a renamed ETCC), but dropped to 12th in the standings winning only once at Andestorp. In 1987 the Italian driver would again switch teams, driving a BMW M3 for Italian outfit CiBiemme Sport in the 1987 World Touring Car Championship where he partnered another former Formula One driver Johnny Cecotto to win the 500 km de Bourgogne at Dijon-Prenois. He finished 8th in the WTCC while finishing 5th in the 1987 ETCC, also for CiBiemme, winning twice at Estoril and Zolder.

The 1988 ETCC saw Brancatelli on the move again, this time going back to Eggenberger Motorsport where he would serve as a driver in the team's 3rd Texaco Ford Sierra RS500 in a number of rounds. Brancatelli would also win the 1988 Italian Touring Car Championship driving a privately entered Alfa Romeo 75.

Other than his success in the 1985 ETCC, arguably Brancatelli's biggest wins in touring car racing were the 1985 Guia Race of Macau driving a Volvo 240T, and the 1989 Spa 24 Hours driving an Eggenberger Ford Sierra RS500 along with Bernd Schneider (yet another F1 driver, this time a current one) and Win Percy. During the late 1980s and early 1990s, Brancatelli also travelled to Australia to drive in the Bathurst 1000 touring car race, though success would generally elude him. His best finish was in the 1987 WTCC round, the 1987 James Hardie 1000 where he and Johnny Cecotto would finish 7th outright and 3rd in class, though as they were the first registered WTCC drivers to finish the race they would receive top points for the round. His three other races at Bathurst in 1989, 1990 and 1991 would result in two failed to finish and one disqualification due to a technical infringement.

Brancatelli also raced at the 24 Hours of Le Mans on five occasions. His best finish was second place in the 1989 24 Hours of Le Mans driving a Sauber C9 for Team Sauber Mercedes, co-driving with ex-Formula One drivers Mauro Baldi and Kenny Acheson. His four other races at Le Mans (1979, 1980, 1986 and 1990) all saw him fail to finish the race.

Brancatelli would continue racing until his retirement in the late 1990s.

Racing record

Complete European Formula Two Championship results
(key) (Races in bold indicate pole position; races in italics indicate fastest lap)

Complete British Formula One Championship results
(key)

Complete Formula One results
(key)

Complete European Touring Car Championship results
(key) (Races in bold indicate pole position) (Races in italics indicate fastest lap)

Complete World Touring Car Championship results
(key) (Races in bold indicate pole position) (Races in italics indicate fastest lap)

† Despite finishing 7th outright at Bathurst, as the highest placed registered WTCC car Brancatelli was awarded 1st place points for the round.

Complete British Touring Car Championship results
(key) (Races in bold indicate pole position in class) (Races in italics indicate fastest lap in class - 1 point awarded all races)

Complete Deutsche Tourenwagen Meisterschaft results
(key) (Races in bold indicate pole position) (Races in italics indicate fastest lap)

Complete 24 Hours of Le Mans results

Complete Bathurst 1000 results

References

External links
Profile at F1 Rejects

1950 births
Living people
Sportspeople from Turin
Italian racing drivers
Italian Formula One drivers
Kauhsen Formula One drivers
Merzario Formula One drivers
European Formula Two Championship drivers
24 Hours of Le Mans drivers
World Touring Car Championship drivers
British Touring Car Championship drivers
World Sportscar Championship drivers
24 Hours of Spa drivers
European Touring Car Championship drivers
British Formula One Championship drivers
24 Hours of Daytona drivers
Australian Endurance Championship drivers
Nismo drivers
Jaguar Racing drivers
Sauber Motorsport drivers